Speedwell is an unincorporated community in Wythe County, Virginia, United States. Speedwell Is famous for 'Cave Hill', a cave in the side of the mountain. Speedwell has been known to be called Speedville.

The Zion Evangelical Lutheran Church Cemetery was listed on the National Register of Historic Places in 1979.

Climate
The climate in this area has mild differences between highs and lows, and there is adequate rainfall year-round.  According to the Köppen Climate Classification system, Speedwell has a temperate oceanic climate, abbreviated "Cfb" on climate maps.

See also
Tazewell M. Starkey#Speedwell Plantation

References

Unincorporated communities in Virginia
Unincorporated communities in Wythe County, Virginia